Scissurella azorensis is a species of minute sea snail, a marine gastropod mollusk in the family Scissurellidae.

Description

Distribution
This species occurs in the Atlantic Ocean off the Azores and in the Mediterranean Sea.

References

 Geiger D.L. (2012) Monograph of the little slit shells. Volume 1. Introduction, Scissurellidae. pp. 1–728. Volume 2. Anatomidae, Larocheidae, Depressizonidae, Sutilizonidae, Temnocinclidae. pp. 729–1291. Santa Barbara Museum of Natural History Monographs Number 7

Scissurellidae
Gastropods described in 2008
Molluscs of the Azores